Aieta is a town and comune in the province of Cosenza in the Calabria region of southern Italy. The name of the town comes from the Greek term aetòs, αετός, meaning "eagle". The town is located within the Pollino National Park, and its historical center is at 524 metres of altitude.

References

Cities and towns in Calabria